Zhang Ting or Chang Ting may refer to:
 Zhang Ting (politician) (张挺; 1922–2018), Minister of the Electronics Industry of China
 Chang Ting (actress) (張庭; born 1970), Taiwanese actress
 Zhang Ting (athlete), Chinese Paralympic athlete